Michael Graczyk (born 1950) is an American journalist.

He was formerly based in the Houston bureau of the Associated Press.  Graczyk officially retired from the AP at the end of July 2018, but continues covering executions and other news stories for the agency as a freelancer.

During his career, Graczyk reported on a wide range of topics.  However, he is most notable as the AP's designated representative to witness executions in Texas.  Since 1984, Graczyk has witnessed more than 429 executions, considered a macabre record for an American.

References

External links
 News reports by Michael Graczyk, via The Free Library

1950 births
Living people
Capital punishment in Texas
People from Houston
Journalists from Texas
Associated Press reporters
20th-century American journalists
American male journalists